Messnerin is a mountain in the Hochschwab Mountains in Styria, Austria, with a height of 1835 m above sea level.

References

Literature
 Peter Rieder: Alpenvereinsführer Hochschwab. Bergverlag Rudolf Rother, München 1976. 

Mountains of Styria
Mountains of the Alps